The 2016 Te Araroa earthquake was an earthquake measuring 7.1 on the moment magnitude scale that occurred at 04:37:55 NZST on 2 September 2016 (16:37:55 UTC 1 September). The earthquake was widely felt throughout the North Island and in the upper South Island. There were no reported casualties, and buildings predominantly suffered only a little bit of damage.

Earthquake

Foreshock 
A magnitude 5.7 earthquake was recorded at 10:04:35 NZST on 1 September 2016, one day prior to the main earthquake.

Aftershocks 
A series of aftershocks followed the earthquake, the largest being a magnitude 6.2 earthquake which occurred at 05:15:05 NZST on 2 September. Dozens of smaller aftershocks were also recorded, with 18 measuring magnitude 5.0 or greater as of 4 November 2016. GeoNet forecast the probability of one or more additional aftershocks measuring between 6.0 and 6.9 as 32% for the month to 12 October while the probability of an earthquake greater than or equal to 7.0 was 4% for the same period.

Aftermath 
Following the earthquake, the Ministry of Civil Defence & Emergency Management (MCDEM) issued a tsunami warning for parts of the north and east coasts of the North Island. Waves measuring 30 cm in height were recorded by tide gauges at East Cape and Great Barrier Island, and although the warning was later cancelled advisories remained in place for strong currents and abnormal sea level fluctuations.

Power outages temporarily affected 300 homes near Rototahi and Waimata north of Gisborne while KiwiRail issued a precautionary shutdown notice for part of the rail network in Auckland.

While no injuries or significant damage occurred, a spokesperson for the Earthquake Commission said they had received 48 claims for damage compensation by 4:30 pm local time on the day of the earthquake. Damage was localised to coastal towns near the epicentre of the earthquake, including in Te Puia Springs where Puketiti Homestead and Stable, a Category 1 historic building, suffered damage to a chimney and fireplace.

See also
List of earthquakes in 2016
List of earthquakes in New Zealand

References

External links 

Earthquakes in New Zealand
Te Araroa
Te Araroa
History of the Gisborne District
Te Araroa
2016 disasters in New Zealand